Inverness is a town in Sunflower County, Mississippi, United States. The population was 1,019 at the 2010 census. As the town had the largest cotton gin in the Delta, it served as a gathering place for farmers from the region when they brought their cotton for processing. The town was heavily damaged by a tornado in 1971.

Historic weather event

The small town was virtually destroyed on February 21, 1971 when an F5 tornado, one of many storms in the outbreak, struck more than a dozen towns in portions of Louisiana and Mississippi. A total of 36 people were killed in rural Mississippi as a result of the storm. Twenty-one of the victims were from Inverness, where a broad section of houses were destroyed.

Geography
Inverness is located at  (33.352845, -90.591992).

Demographics

2020 census

As of the 2020 United States Census, there were 868 people, 355 households, and 256 families residing in the town.

2010 census
As of the 2010 United States Census, there were 1,019 people living in the town. The racial makeup of the town was 50.7% Black, 47.6% White, 0.2% Native American, 0.6% Asian and 0.2% from two or more races. 0.7% were Hispanic or Latino of any race.

2000 census
As of the census of 2000, there were 1,153 people, 411 households, and 311 families living in the town. The population density was 800.4 people per square mile (309.1/km2). There were 432 housing units at an average density of 299.9 per square mile (115.8/km2). The racial makeup of the town was 59.41% African American, 39.64% White,  0.78% Asian, and 0.17% from two or more races. Hispanic or Latino of any race were 1.13% of the population.

There were 411 households, out of which 31.1% had children under the age of 18 living with them, 46.2% were married couples living together, 24.6% had a female householder with no husband present, and 24.1% were non-families. 22.4% of all households were made up of individuals, and 12.2% had someone living alone who was 65 years of age or older. The average household size was 2.81 and the average family size was 3.28.

In the town, the population was spread out, with 27.6% under the age of 18, 10.8% from 18 to 24, 24.8% from 25 to 44, 21.9% from 45 to 64, and 14.9% who were 65 years of age or older. The median age was 34 years. For every 100 females, there were 86.0 males. For every 100 females age 18 and over, there were 82.3 males.

The median income for a household in the town was $27,500, and the median income for a family was $31,912. Males had a median income of $26,429 versus $19,000 for females. The per capita income for the town was $12,050. About 26.6% of families and 34.0% of the population were below the poverty line, including 39.8% of those under age 18 and 39.3% of those age 65 or over.

Education

Primary and secondary schools

The Town of Inverness is served by the Sunflower County Consolidated School District (formerly Sunflower County School District). Residents are zoned to school in Moorhead, Mississippi.  it was zoned to Ruleville Central High School (now Thomas E. Edwards, Sr. High School), at the time the sole school of the district.

After desegregation began in Inverness in the mid-20th century, white parents withdrew their children from the white public school, which closed. The white high school students began attending a private school in Indianola. Formerly Inverness School (K-8) is the sole public school in Inverness. Inverness School closed in 2022, with students redirected to Moorhead.

Central Delta Academy was constructed in Inverness as a segregation academy, a private school for white students whose parents did not want them in the public school system, which was under federal rulings to desegregate. It closed on May 21, 2010. The building was auctioned off in 2011, and was bulldozed soon thereafter.

Colleges and universities
Delta State University, a public research university, and Mississippi Valley State University, a historically black college, are in the area.

Public libraries
The Sunflower County Library operates the Inverness Public Library.

Notable people

Mary E. Flowers, Member of the Illinois House of Representatives, was born here; her family moved to Chicago, where she grew up and went to college
 Henry Gantz, youngest coach to win the Mississippi Association Independent Schools Overall Title.
Boyd Gilmore (June 1, 1905 – December 23, 1976) – a Delta blues musician was born near Inverness
Samuel Jones, composer and Mississippi Musicians Hall of Fame inductee was born in Inverness in 1935.
Willie Kent, Blues musician
Little Milton, Blues musician and Mississippi Musicians Hall of Fame member was born in Inverness in 1934.
Ernie Terrell, boxer.
Norris Thomas, professional American football player

References

External links

 Inverness Chamber of Commerce
 Inverness Elementary School

Towns in Sunflower County, Mississippi
Towns in Mississippi